The Large Hadron Collider is a particle accelerator and collider on the Franco-Swiss border near Geneva, Switzerland.

LHC also may refer to:
Lahore High Court, a high court in Lahore, Punjab, Pakistan
Lausanne Hockey Club, an ice hockey team from Lausanne, Switzerland
League of Historical Cities
Les Horribles Cernettes (English: The Horrible CERN Girls), a parody pop group in France
Linköpings HC, an ice hockey team from Linköping, Sweden
Little Hoover Commission, an independent California state oversight agency
The Landmark Hotel and Casino, Las Vegas, closed 1990